Beinn nan Aighenan is a  high mountain in the Grampian Mountains of Scotland. It lies in Argyll and Bute, north of the village of Taynuilt.

An isolated mountain, the most popular routes to its summit are from either Glen Kinglass or a climb above the ridge from Glen Etive.

References

Mountains and hills of Argyll and Bute
Marilyns of Scotland
Munros